Qaleh-ye Malek (also Romanized as Qal‘eh-ye Malek; also known as Ghal‘eh Malek) is a village in Varzaq-e Jonubi Rural District, in the Central District of Faridan County, Isfahan Province, Iran. At the 2006 census, its population was 152, in 40 families.

References 

Populated places in Faridan County